Sergio Manuel Basáñez Rodríguez (born May 4, 1970 in Poza Rica, Veracruz, Mexico) is a Mexican actor.

Career
Sergio started his acting career at an early age. Before he got leading roles in soap operas, he made special appearances in them, while he studied acting. Simultaneously, he also studied law and became a lawyer.

At the age 22, Basañez got his first leading role in the Televisa soap opera Sueño de Amor (1992–1993). In 1994, he moved to Miami to star in the soap opera Morelia, and in 1995, he returned to Mexico to perform a special appearance in Marisol.  

Then, in 1998, his last performances for Televisa were in La usurpadora and La Mentira, as he moved to TV Azteca, in 1999, where he got the leading role of Catalina y Sebastián, with Mexican actress Silvia Navarro, followed by La calle de las novias (2000), and Cuando seas mía (2001), for which he was awarded as the best actor in a leading role. This particular dramatic series was a remake of Café con Aroma de Mujer. Its original version was taped in Colombia. 

In 2003, he starred in Un nuevo amor, with Vanessa Acosta, followed by La heredera. In 1997, he starred in the famous Mexican musical Aventurera, winning the Herald Award. In 2003, he starred in the stage play El Tenorio Cómico, for a long season.

Basañez has also performed in children’s plays, such as: Pedro el Lobo, and La Bella Durmiente. 

From 2005 to 2006, Basañez performed the leading role in the most successful soap opera broadcast by TV Azteca, Amor en custodia with leading lady Margarita Gralia, a famous actress from Argentina. He portrayed a tough, and at the same time tender bodyguard.

Television roles

References

External links and sources

1970 births
Mexican male film actors
Mexican male telenovela actors
Mexican male stage actors
Mexican male television actors
Male actors from Veracruz
Living people
People from Poza Rica
20th-century Mexican male actors
21st-century Mexican male actors